Faniswa Yisa is a South African actress and director. An alumnus of University of Cape Town drama school (1998-00), Yisa has stated that she draws energy in the art from fellow women. Her film credits includes: Ingoma, What Remains, DAM, Knuckle City. Yisa is a 2020 best supporting actress nominee at the Africa Movie Academy Awards.

References

External links
 

Living people
South African actresses
University of Cape Town alumni
Year of birth missing (living people)